The 1943 Cupa României Final was the 10th final of Romania's most prestigious football cup competition. It was disputed between CFR Turnu Severin and Sportul Studențesc București, and was won by CFR Turnu Severin after a victory with 4 goals. It was the first time in history for the team from Drobeta-Turnu Severin.

Match details

See also 
List of Cupa României finals

References

External links
Romaniansoccer.ro

1943
Cupa
Romania